MacWEEK was a controlled-circulation weekly Apple Macintosh trade journal based in San Francisco founded by Michael Tchong, John Anderson, Glenn Patch, Dick Govatski, and Michael F. Billings. It featured a back-page rumor column penned by the pseudonymous Mac the Knife.

Founded in 1987, it was acquired by Ziff-Davis in 1988. In 1998, as part of a strategy change, the print publication was relaunched as eMediaWeekly, which caused a number of its existing sponsors to withhold their advertising. eMediaWeekly was published from August 24, 1998 to February 1, 1999. The online edition of MacWEEK continued for several years, originally under the editorial management of MacWEEK staff members and later under the management of former Macworld editors. It was later shuttered in favor of Mac Publishing's Macworld and MacCentral sites.

Rumors about Apple and its products were often published in MacWEEK which essentially became the source of record. Apple employees, following the example of executive Jean-Louis Gassée, at times referred to it as "MacLeak", yet some relied on it to distribute information they could not officially disclose, to draw internal corporate attention or funding to their projects, or to find out what was happening in their own company.

References

Weekly magazines published in the United States
Defunct computer magazines published in the United States
Macintosh magazines
Magazines established in 1987
Magazines disestablished in 1999
Magazines published in San Francisco